Smithsonidrilus pauper is a species of oligochaete worm. It was first found in Peru.

References

External links

Tubificina
Invertebrates of Peru
Invertebrates of South America
Animals described in 1990